A Man at His Place is a 1972 Soviet drama film directed by Aleksey Sakharov.

Plot 
Semyon Bobrov goes to work at the plant and works there for three years, after which he returns to his native village, where he offers his candidacy for the post of chairman of the collective farm.

Cast 
 Vladimir Menshov as Semyon Bobrov
 Anastasiya Vertinskaya
 Armen Dzhigarkhanyan
 Lev Durov
 Viktor Avdyushko
 Nina Menshikova	
 Georgi Burkov
 Konstantin Zabelin	
 Viktor Shulgin
 Oleg Efremov

References

External links 
 

1972 films
1970s Russian-language films
Soviet drama films
Mosfilm films
1972 drama films